The University of Rostock is a public university located in Rostock, Mecklenburg-Vorpommern, Germany. Founded in 1419, it is the third-oldest university in Germany. It is the oldest university in continental northern Europe and the Baltic Sea area, and 8th oldest in Central Europe. It was the 5th university established in the Holy Roman Empire.

The university has been associated with four Nobel laureates: Albrecht Kossel, Karl von Frisch, Otto Stern, and Walter H. Schottky. It is a member of the European University Association. According to a ranking published by Times Higher Education in 2018, it is the most beautiful university in Germany and the fourth most beautiful university in all of Europe. The language of instruction is usually German and English for some postgraduate studies.

History
The university was founded in 1419 by confirmation of Pope Martin V and thus is one of the oldest universities in Northern Europe.

In Germany, there are only five universities that were founded earlier, while only Heidelberg and Leipzig operated continuously since then: Heidelberg (1386), Cologne (1388), Erfurt (1392/1994), Würzburg (1402/1582) and Leipzig (1409).
That makes Rostock University the third oldest German university in continuous operation.

Throughout the 15th and 16th centuries, the University of Rostock had about 400 to 500 students each year and was among the most important universities in Germany and Northern Europe at the time, with many of its students originating from the Low Countries, Scandinavia or other countries bordering the Baltic Sea.

In the course of political struggles and due to pressure from the church, the university moved to Greifswald in 1437 and remained there until 1443. From 1487 to 1488 teaching took place in Lübeck.

A few years after the city of Rostock, the university became Protestant in 1542. Henceforth, Humanism and Lutheranism were defining characteristics of the university. After the Thirty Years' War (1618–1648), however, for about two centuries the University of Rostock played only a regional role. After the "ownership" of the university had moved from the city to the state (Grand Duchy of Mecklenburg-Schwerin) in 1827, however, things changed for the better. The second half of the 19th century saw generous building activity in Rostock's alma mater and the university soon regained its old reputation amongst German universities.

1919–1945

On the occasion of the 500th anniversary of the university, Albert Einstein and Max Planck received honorary doctorates on 12 November 1919. This made the University of Rostock the world's first institute of higher learning to award this honour to Einstein. The doctorate was not revoked during the Nazi rule in Germany (1933–1945), despite such orders by the Nazis. The reason for this remains unknown. Psychologist David Katz and professor of dentistry and dean of the medical faculty  lost their posts in 1933 among others.

1945–1989

The end of the Second World War in 1945 brought many changes. The university, now finding itself in the Soviet Zone of Germany (the later German Democratic Republic), was re-opened on 24 February 1946. The Faculty of Law was closed in 1951, a Faculty of Agriculture was introduced in 1950 and in 1951 saw the opening of a Department of Shipbuilding (renamed Faculty of Technology in 1963). The University of Rostock was the first traditional university in Germany to open a technical faculty. In 1952, the Faculty of Aviation was opened, but eventually relocated to Dresden.

In 1976 the university was renamed Wilhelm-Pieck-Universität after Wilhelm Pieck, the first president of the German Democratic Republic. The renaming was annulled after the German reunification.

1989 to present

External funding increased by 83 % between 2005 and 2010 alone and currently is above 47 million Euros per year. Over 500 million Euros have been invested in the university infrastructure since 1991, reaching 750 million Euros by 2015. The numbers of young people from Germany and of international students who choose Rostock as a place to study are increasing every year. As of today, students from at least 99 different countries have studied at Rostock. In 2007, the University of Rostock reorganized its research capacities into three profile lines: Life, Light & Matter, Maritime Systems, and Aging of Individuals and Societies. In 2010, a fourth profile was added, called Knowledge – Culture – Transformation.

Organization and structure

Like many continental European universities, the University of Rostock is divided into academic faculties (German: Fakultät). Those can be sub-divided into academic departments (German: Institut) and chairs (German: Lehrstuhl).

Faculties
It is divided into the following nine faculties:

Faculty of Agricultural and Environmental Sciences
Plants and Soil
Ecology and (Coastal)-Landscape
Biomass, Aqua and Livestock Sciences
Faculty of Computer Science and Electrical Engineering
Institute of Computer Science
Institute for Visual and Analytic Computing
Institute of Electrical Engineering
Department of Computational Engineering
Faculty of Law
Department of Law
International Commercial Law
International Business Administration
Faculty of Mechanical Engineering and Marine Technology
Mechanical Engineering
Marine Technology
Mechatronics
Biomedical Technology
Faculty of Mathematics and Natural Sciences
Institute of Biology
Institute of Chemistry
Institute of Mathematics
Institute of Physics
Interdisciplinary Faculty
Department of Life, Light and Matter
Department of Maritime Systems
Department of Knowledge – Culture – Transformation
Department of Ageing of Individuals and Society
Faculty of Medicine
Albrecht Kossel Institute for Neuroregeneration
General Medicine
Dental Medicine
Anatomy
Medical Biotechnology
Informatics in Medicine and Gerontology
Diagnostic and Interventional Radiology
Experimental Surgery
History of Medicine
Immunology
Clinical Chemistry and Laboratory Medicine
Medical Biochemistry and Molecular Biology
Medical Biology
Medical Genetics
Medical Microbiology
Medical Psychology and Sociology
Pathology
Pharmacology and Toxicology
Physiology
Proteome Center Rostock 
Forensic Medicine
Transfusion Medicine
Institute of Experimental Gene Therapy and Tumor Research
Cell Biology
Faculty of Theology
Institute of Image Theory
Institute of Text and Culture
Faculty of Arts and Humanities
Institute of General and Social Pedagogy
Institute of Educational Psychology Rosa and David Katz
Institute for School Pedagogy and Educational Research
Institute for Elementary School Pedagogy
Institute for Special Education Development and Rehabilitation
Institute for Vocational Education
Institute for English/American Studies
Institute for German Studies
Institute for Romance Studies
Heinrich Schliemann Institute of Classical Studies
Institute of History
Institute for Media Research
Institute of Philosophy
Institute of Sports Science
Wossidlo Research Center for European Ethnology/Folklore
Moritz Schlick Research Center
Uwe Johnson Research Center
Research and Documentation Center of the State of Mecklenburg-Western Pomerania on the History of Dictatorships in Germany
Faculty of Economic and Social Sciences
Institute of Business Administration
Institute of Marketing and Services Research
Institute of Sociology and Demography
Institute of Political and Administrative Sciences
Institute of Economics

Facilities

Rostock University Library

The Rostock University Library consists of 3 divisional libraries and several specialized libraries provides scientific literature and information for research, education and study. The university statistics shows about 3 million physical volumes recorded in the catalogue. It provides access to electronic journals (EZB) and specialized databases (DBIS). The library possesses large special collections of culturally historical and scientifically historical old books. In the Patents and Standards Centre (PNZ), all DIN norms and regulations as well as the VDI guidelines are provided. Moreover, the library also contains the university archive and the art treasure collection.

Rostock Student Services

The Rostock Student Services (German: Studentenwerk Rostock) provides accommodation for newly arrived international students who plan to study at the University of Rostock and the Rostock University of Music and Theatre. International students, who have not lived or studied in Germany, are considered for a Starter Package service. However, short-time students and students on a programme (ERASMUS; Sokrates) are given a low priority.

Rostock University Hospital
The university operates a hospital, which has several teaching and research institutes. Among those are the Albrecht Kossel Institute for Neuroregeneration.

Points of interest

 Botanischer Garten Universität Rostock, the university's botanical garden
 Zoological Collection Rostock, founded in 1775 by Oluf Gerhard Tychsen. Parts of the collection are open to the public.

Academic profile

Rankings

University of Rostock was ranked in 2014: 401–500 in the world in the Shanghai Jiao Tong University's Academic Ranking of World Universities.

The CWTS Leiden Ranking ranked University of Rostock as 405th in 2014.

Moreover, QS World University Rankings ranked University of Rostock as 551st within the top universities in 2015.

However, Times Higher Education World University Rankings has not listed University of Rostock within the top 400 universities since 2011.

In 2014, the Center for World University Rankings (CWUR) ranked University of Rostock as 481st in the world.

According to the University Ranking by Academic Performance (URAP), Rostock University was ranked as 34th in Germany and 428th in the world in 2014.

The Academic Ranking of World Universities (ARWU) ranked University of Rostock among 101–150 in Chemistry in the world in 2014. In 2014, the CWTS Leiden Ranking ranked University of Rostock in the world as 269th in Natural Sciences, 336th in Life Sciences, 463rd in Medical Sciences, 449th in Mathematics, Computer Science and Engineering, and 245th in Cognitive Science. According to the University Ranking by Academic Performance (URAP), Rostock University was ranked 224th worldwide in Chemistry in 2014.

Research

In recent years, the University of Rostock has undergone significant conceptual and organisational changes, which included the bundling of competences and research activities in the interdisciplinary, cross-faculty departments of the Interdisciplinary Faculty. Scientific priorities of the faculties have improved by including the interdisciplinary-based research units: Collaborative Research Centres, Research Training Groups, and Research Units.

The university cooperates with several independent research centres. Among those:
 Leibniz Institute of Atmospheric Physics, Kühlungsborn (IAP)
 Leibniz Institute for Catalysis (LIKAT)
 Leibniz Institute for Baltic Sea Research, Warnemünde (IOW)
 Leibniz Institute for Farm Animal Biology, Dummerstorf
 Max Planck Institute for Demographic Research
 Fraunhofer Institute for Computer Graphics Research, Department Rostock (IGD)
 Fraunhofer Application Centre Large Structures in Production Engineering (AGP)
 Hanseatic Institute for Entrepreneurship and Regional Development at the University of Rostock (HIE-RO)
 Institute for Implant Technology and Biomaterials
 Institute of banking law and bank management
 Reference- and Translation Center for Cardiac Stem Cell Therapy
 Rostock Center for the Study of Demographic Change
 Faculty of Interdisciplinary Research (INF)
 Center for Life Science Automation (CELISCA)
 Centre of Teacher training and Educational research

Partner universities

Although cooperation and student exchanges are possible with many more institutions, the university has signed cooperation agreements with the following international universities:

Europe
  Charles University in Prague, Czech Republic
  University of Zagreb, Croatia
  University of Copenhagen, Denmark
  University of Turku, Finland
  University of Nantes, France
  University of Latvia, Latvia
  Gdańsk University, Poland
  Saint Petersburg State University, Russia
  University of Kristianstad, Sweden
  Newcastle University, UK

World
  National University of La Plata, Argentina
  Memorial University of Newfoundland, Canada
  University of Saskatchewan, Canada
  University of Guelph, Canada
  Science University of Tokyo, Japan
  North-West University, South Africa
  University of Georgia, United States
  Brown University, United States
  University of Utah, United States
  Arab International University (AIU), Syria
  University of Wyoming, United States
  University of Alabama in Huntsville, United States

Notable alumni and faculty

In nearly six centuries numerous notable students and professors have had ties with the university, for instance:
  (1409–1469), from Geismar, Hesse, astronomer, mathematician, pastor, taught at Rostock and Thorn, wrote 
 Hans Teiste, 29th Bishop of Bergen, Norway (Magister in 1468)
 Hoskuld Hoskuldsson, 28th and last Roman Catholic Bishop of Stavanger (Magister in 1493)
 Mogens Lauritssøn, 27th and last Roman Catholic Bishop of Hamar (Magister in 1494)
 Ulrich von Hutten (1488–1523), humanist, wrote his first important opus in Rostock in 1509
 Olaus Magnus (1490–1557), Swedish humanist, ethnologist and cartographer
 Olav Engelbrektsson, 28th and last Roman Catholic Archbishop of Nidaros (Baccalaureus in 1505, Magister in 1507)
 Levinus Battus (1545–1591), physician (MA in 1559)
 David Chyträus (1530–1600), theologian, education policy maker and historian, Professor of Theology since 1561
 Tycho Brahe (1546–1601), Danish astronomer (studied in 1566)
 Axel Oxenstierna (1583–1654), Swedish chancellor, strategist and statesman (studied, 1599–1601)
 Joachim Jungius (1587–1657), mathematician, physicist and philosopher, Professor of Mathematics in Rostock from 1624 to 1628
  (1669–1725), Superintendent of Lueneburg, poet who wrote baroque poems and song texts, studied theology until 1694
 Oluf Gerhard Tychsen (1734–1815), Orientalist and Hebrew scholar; taught at the University of Rostock from 1778
 Samuel Gottlieb Vogel (1750–1837), physician, Professor of Medicine in Rostock since 1789
  (1751–1829), economist and agricultural economist
 Johann Heinrich Friedrich Link (1767–1850), natural scientist, Professor of Chemistry, Zoology and Phytology from 1792 to 1811
 Johann Heinrich von Thünen (1783–1850), economist and social reformer (Dr. h.c. in 1830)
  (1784–1841), jurist, professor from 1816
  (1789–1875), jurist, vice-chancellor of the University of Rostock, 1836 to 1870
 Fritz Reuter (1810–1874), novelist, studied law at the University of Rostock from 1831, received an honorary doctorate in 1863
 John Brinckman (1814–1870), poet, studied law at the University of Rostock from 1834 to 1838
 Carl Friedrich Wilhelm Brockmann, philosopher (PhD in 1848)
 Heinrich Schliemann (1822–1890), archaeologist (PhD in 1869)
  (1831–1893), actuary (PhD in 1858)
 Rudolf Berlin (1833–1897), physician, Professor of Ophthalmology, dean since 1895 and rector since 1897
 Hermann Roesler (1833–1897), physician, Professor of Ophthalmology, dean and rector
 Rudolph Sohm (1841–1917), lawyer and Church historian
 Albrecht Kossel (1853–1927), medical scientist and Nobel Prize laureate (PhD 1878)
 Eugen Geinitz (1854–1925), geologist and mineralogist, Professor of Mineralogy and Geology, Director of the Mineralogical-Geological Institute
 Isaac Rülf, philosopher, humanitarian organizer, author (PhD in 1865)
 Rudolf Steiner (1861–1925), Philosopher (Dr. phil. in 1891)
 Emil Mattiesen (1875–1939), composer, pianist and philosopher, Professor of church music from 1929
  (1878–1959), jurist and expert on Scandinavian studies, translator of the Edda songs, Professor of Public Law from 1920 to 1922
 Gustav Mie (1868–1957), physicist, studied physics at the University of Rostock from 1886 to 1889
 Moritz Schlick, (1882–1936), philosopher, habilitation in 1911, lecturer from 1911 to 1921, later initiator of the Viennese Circle; at the Institute of Philosophy of the Faculty of Humanities 
  (1883–1960), physician, co-founder of Hematology, Head of the Rostock University Hospital 
 David Katz (1884–1953), psychologist, from 1919 to 1933 associate professor, later professor, conferred to emerited status by the National Socialists due to his Jewish origins.
  (1885–1933), ab 1920 erst from 1920 on international significant Associate Professor, later Professor of Dentistry, committed suicide after he was dismissed because of his Jewish origins; commemorative plaque in the foyer of the main university building 
 Walter H. Schottky (1886–1976), physicist, Professor of theoretical Physics from 1923 to 1927
 Karl von Frisch (1886–1980), ethologist and Nobel laureate in medicine (zoology professor, 1921–1923)
 Otto Stern (1888–1969), Nobel laureate in physics, (experimental physics professor, 1921–1923)
 Albert Einstein, Nobel laureate in physics (Dr. h.c. in 1919)
 Max Planck, Nobel laureate in physics (Dr. h.c. in 1919)
 Kurt von Fritz (1900–1985), classical philologist, Professor of Greek Studies from 1933 to 1935 
 Walter Hallstein (1901–1982), politician and jurist, first President of the European Commission, State Secretary in the German Chancellors Office and the Foreign Office (law professor 1930–1941)
 Pascual Jordan (1902–1980), physicist, co-founder of Quantum mechanics, later professor of Physics from 1929 to 1944
 Eugen Gerstenmaier (1906–1986), theologian and politician, member of the Kreisauer Circle, later President of the German Bundestag, Promotion at the Faculty of Theology in 1935
  (1906–1971), statistician, studied politology, doctorate degree as Dr. rer. pol. in 1940
 Gonzalo Rojas (1917–2011), Chilean poet (professor, 1973–1975)
 Arno Esch (1928–1951), student and liberal politician, active member of the Liberal Democratic Party, condemned to death as declared opponent of communism; commemorative plaque in the foyer of the main university building
 Joachim Gauck, 11th President of Germany, studied theology in Rostock until 1965, honorary doctor in 1999
 Walter Kempowski (1929–2007), writer, honorary professor of Contemporary German Literature and Cultural History since 2003
 Hans Apel (1932–2011), politician, former Federal Minister of Finance, later Minister of Defense, Honorary professor of Financial Policy at the Faculty of Economic and Social Sciences since 1993
 Uwe Johnson (1934–1984), author, studied German language and literature at the University of Rostock from 1952 to 1956
 Hans-Joachim Schulze (born 1934), German Bach scholar 
 Bettina Meyer, Antarctic researcher in marine biology, received her doctorate from the University of Rostock in 1996
 Viviana Simon, Professor of Microbiology, received her doctorate in 1997.

See also 
 Catalogus Professorum Rostochiensium
 List of medieval universities
 List of universities in Germany
 List of oldest universities in continuous operation
 Medieval university

References

External links

 University of Rostock
 University of Rostock – short history in the Catholic Encyclopedia
 Albrecht-Kossel-Insitut für Neuroregeneration
 Catalogus Professorum Rostochiensium
 Rostocker Matrikelportal (1419–1945)

 
1410s establishments in the Holy Roman Empire
1419 establishments in Europe
Educational institutions established in the 15th century
Universities and colleges in Mecklenburg-Western Pomerania
University
University